Édgar Filiberto Ramírez Arellano (born 25 March 1977) is a Venezuelan actor. Ramírez studied communications at the Andrés Bello Catholic University. He then worked in media and considered becoming a diplomat. When Guillermo Arriaga praised a short film he had done, he decided to pursue his performing hobby as a career. He played Carlos the Jackal in the 2010 biopic series Carlos, a role for which he won the César Award for Most Promising Actor at the 2011 César Awards, and was nominated for a Golden Globe and Emmy Award for Best Actor. He also played Larry, a CIA operative in the film Zero Dark Thirty, Paz—a CIA assassin—in The Bourne Ultimatum, and boxer Roberto Durán in Hands of Stone. Ramírez won at the 2012 ALMA Awards for Ares in Wrath of the Titans. He received several award nominations for his portrayal of Gianni Versace in the 2018 miniseries The Assassination of Gianni Versace: American Crime Story. In 2020, he had a recurring role in the HBO miniseries The Undoing. In 2022, Ramírez was part of the Un Certain Regard jury at the Cannes Film Festival.

Early life 
Ramírez was born in San Cristóbal, Táchira, Venezuela, the son of Soday Arellano, an attorney, and Filiberto Ramírez, a military officer. He has a sister named Nataly and a niece and nephew named Enrique and Maria Camilla. Part of his childhood was spent traveling in different countries; he speaks Spanish, English, French, Italian and German fluently.

Ramírez graduated in 1999 from the Andrés Bello Catholic University in Caracas with a degree in mass communication, minoring in audiovisual communications, although he intended to pursue international relations. While in college he worked as an emerging journalist, reporting on politics. Later, he became executive director of Dale al Voto, a Venezuelan foundation . He and his team created campaigns for radio, television and movie theaters. However, he was always attracted to the performing arts and while in college was involved with the arts. Ramírez was in charge of international promotions of the Viart Film Festival. "I'll be lying if I told you I dreamed about becoming an actor as a kid. But I wasn't in any different to the world of performing arts. I was always very attracted to it. I just never thought about it as a career." Ramírez passed it up, as he was in the middle of his thesis and was to attend Harvard National Model UN that year as a delegate from his school. Ramírez then decided to pursue his acting interests.

Acting career 
Ramirez's first recognition as an actor was the successful soap opera Cosita rica, for Venevisión which aired from September 2003 to August 2004, lasting 270 episodes. In 2005, he made his major motion-picture début playing Choco, Domino Harvey's love interest in the film Domino directed by Tony Scott.

He was in Vantage Point directed by Pete Travis. In this high-budgeted Sony Pictures political thriller, Ramírez joined an all-star international cast including Dennis Quaid, Matthew Fox, William Hurt, Forest Whitaker, Eduardo Noriega, and Ayelet Zurer. Ramírez plays Javier, an ex-special forces soldier forced to kidnap the American President in order to get his brother back. Upcoming is Cyrano Fernandez, with Ramírez in the title role. This independent production was directed by Alberto Arvelo.

Ramírez has appeared in several other productions. Among those are the first part of the two film bundle Che by Steven Soderbergh, where he played the role of Ciro Redondo (a Cuban revolutionary who fought with Ché Guevara), La Hora Cero (The Magic Hour), a short film directed by Guillermo Arriaga; Plan B, directed by Alejandro García Wiederman (Venezuela); Yotama se va volando (Yotama Flies Away), directed by Luis Armando Roche (Venezuela-France); Punto y raya (Step Forward), directed by Elia K. Schneider (Venezuela-Spain-Chile-Uruguay), submitted by Venezuela for Oscar consideration for 2004 Best Foreign Film, in which he played Colombian soldier Pedro.

In 2007, he played the role of Paz, a Blackbriar assassin, in The Bourne Ultimatum; in its source novel The Bourne Ultimatum, the villain is Ilich Ramírez Sánchez, a.k.a. Carlos the Jackal. Ramírez went on to play the role of the actual Carlos in the 2010 French-German limited series Carlos. At the French César Awards 2011, he was awarded, for the film version of the TV series, the César Award for Most Promising Actor. Ramírez has also given his voice to language learning education, guest-starring on the audio CD supplement to the Fluenz Spanish 1 DVD software.

Ramírez appeared in the Clash of the Titans (2010) sequel, Wrath of the Titans (2012), playing Ares, the God of War. In 2012, he played Larry in the Kathryn Bigelow film Zero Dark Thirty. He played Bodhi in the 2015 remake of Point Break. In 2016, he played Dr. Kamal Abdic in the film The Girl on the Train.

On 18 November 2016, Hollywood Reporter interviewed Ramírez about his stolen watches. Thieves broke into Ramírez's apartment in Caracas and stole his watch collection including a Chanel J12 Chromatic titanium ceramic watch; a Cartier Santos; a TAG Heuer Aquaracer, a Montblanc TimeWalker Chronograph. Other watches in his collection are the Cartier Drive; a Montblanc "Homage to Nicolas Rieussec"; and the Harmony and Patrimony timepieces, both by Vacheron Constantin all worth about $150,000.

In 2017, Ramírez played Gianni Versace in the second season of the anthology series American Crime Story. In 2019, Ramírez joined the cast of the spy thriller film The 355, which was released in 2022 and reunited him with ACS co-star Penélope Cruz.

Philanthropy 
Ramírez supports the campaign "No Dispares" (Don't Shoot), by Amnesty International, the international human-rights organization. The campaign's purpose is to eliminate the number of injuries and deaths caused by the irresponsible use of guns.

Ramírez was also part of "5 Senses in Action", an organization which benefits children with special needs. On 13 July 2008, he took part in an outdoor activity that stimulated sensory experience through gestures, playing and singing for congenitally deaf and/or blind children.

On 12 November 2010, Ramírez was named a Goodwill Ambassador of the United Nations Children's Fund (UNICEF), at an event held at the Eurobuilding Hotel in Caracas, and attended by personalities from the country's diplomatic corps. The UNICEF representative in Venezuela, Nadya Vásquez, said the organization has established in recent years an alliance with the actor "through which it is provided to support activities directly related to violence prevention campaigns".

Filmography

Film

Television

Music videos

References

External links 

 
 Club fans website

1977 births
Living people
Male actors from Caracas
People from San Cristóbal, Táchira
Venezuelan male film actors
Andrés Bello Catholic University alumni
Venezuelan expatriates in the United States
Venezuelan emigrants to France
21st-century Venezuelan male actors
Most Promising Actor César Award winners